Feng Timo (born December 19, 1991), originally named Feng Yanan, is a Chinese singer and internet personality from Wanzhou District, Chongqing, China. In 2017 she was named one of the "Top 10 Influential Big V's (Verified accounts) of Sina Weibo".

As of October 2018, Feng Timo has over 17.5 million followers on her live room on the live-streaming site Douyu. She also has over 8.4 million followers on Sina Weibo (as of 28 September 2018).

Career

Career as an anchor and a singer 
In 2014, Feng Timo graduated from Beijing Normal University Zhuhai Campus and began her career as a college teacher at Chongqing Vocational School in Wanzhou, Chongqing. In September 2014, she launched her career as a network anchor.

In September 2016, Timo covered Tanya Chua's song "Don't Trouble Me". In December that year, she sang the theme song "You Don't Understand Me" for the film Suddenly Seventeen.

She released her first single, "The Food is Junjie", in June 2017. In November, she appeared in a concert of "League of Legends" with Chen Yifa and A Leng. In December, she sang the theme song "The Return of the Exes" for the film The Ex-File 3: The Return of the Exes. In September 2018, her single "Blowing the Sea Breeze" was released. In November 2018, her single "Heart-shaped Universe" was released as an interlude song of television series Ever Night. On December 31, 2018, Feng appeared on the grand ceremony of Mask Singer.

Feng has appeared on the variety show Make Progress Every Day, and served as a judge on 2018 Miss Chongqing.

In February 2019, Feng appeared on the Nasdaq Screen on the Times Square, New York City, US. She also became a "Live+Performance" promotion ambassador of China Performance Guild.

Charities and public benefits 
In May 2018, Feng worked with the Chongqing Communist Youth League as a Promotion Ambassador. In July 2018, Feng took part in activity "Persistence under High Temperature" of Douyu, and worked with traffic polices; In August, she took part in the 9th Qinling Panda Tourism Festival and Benefit Concert; In September, she worked as the Tourism Promotion Ambassador of Hechuan District, Chongqing.

Discography

Covers

Singles

Awards

Comprehensive Awards

Awards of Songs

References

External links
 Feng Timo's YouTube
 Feng Timo's bilibili account
 馮提莫－新浪微博超級話題
 馮提莫－網易雲電台
 Twitter/Blog
 Instagram

Living people
1991 births
Singers from Chongqing
Chinese Internet celebrities
21st-century Chinese women singers
Beijing Normal University alumni
YouTubers from Chongqing